V. V. Zikeev (Russian: В. В. Зикеев; 1892–1957) was a surgeon and physician of the Kazakh Soviet Socialist Republic .

A graduate of Moscow State University (1919), in 1936 he wrote a thesis on “Causalgia treatment” and in 1947 his thesis was on “Intracranial pressure”. He authored more than 50 research publications. From 1934 to 1943 he served as a rector of the Kazakh State Medical Institute, first deputy Minister of Health (1950 – 1952), and chief surgeon at the Ministry of Health (1943 – 1949).

Zikeev was honored for his contribution to medicine in Kazakhstan and the Soviet Union with the Order of Lenin and other distinguished medals.

References
Zikeev V. V. Kazakh National Medical University

Soviet surgeons
1892 births
1957 deaths
20th-century surgeons
Kazakhstani surgeons